Federal Route 15 is main federal road in the Klang Valley region, Selangor, Malaysia. The main link begins from Kampung Melayu Subang at Subang to Sultan Abdul Aziz Shah Airport (Skypark) and ends at Subang Jaya.

Overview

Sultan Abdul Aziz Shah Airport Road
The Sultan Abdul Aziz Shah Airport Highway is a major road linking Subang Jaya interchange of the Federal Highway (Federal Route 2) to the Sultan Abdul Aziz Shah Airport.

Subang–Kelana Jaya Link
The Subang–Kelana Jaya Link is an elevated highway linking Subang Jaya interchange of the Federal Route 2 to Persiaran Kewajipan.

Route background
The Kilometre Zero is located at Subang Jaya, at its interchange with the Federal Route 2.

Features
 The highway is lined by palm oil trees and rubber trees until 1999. But today it was developed as the new township area like Ara Damansara.
 Many seafood restaurants along this road near Subang Airport.
 The Kewajipan flyover on the Bulatan Kewajipan roundabout is a tallest flyover of the Subang–Kelana Jaya Link.
 The elevated Sungai Buloh–Kajang MRT line from Sungai Buloh to Kwasa Sentral.
 The elevated Kelana Jaya LRT line from Ara Damansara to Glenmarie.

At most sections, the Federal Route 15 was built under the JKR R5 road standard, allowing maximum speed limit of up to 90 km/h.

There is an alternate route: Subang North–Terminal 3: Subang Bypass (part of Subang Airport Highway).

One section has motorcycle lanes: Subang Airport roundabout–Subang-NKVE interchange.

List of interchanges and junctions

References

Malaysian Federal Roads